Rosie's may refer to:

 Rosie's Diner, a diner in Rockford, Michigan, United States
 Rosie's Gaming Emporium, a brand of casinos in Virginia, United States
 Rosie's Place, sanctuary for poor and homeless women in Boston, Massachusetts, United States
 The Chatham, also known as Rosie's Bar or Rosie's, a former bar in Monte Carlo, Monaco

See also
 Rosie's Rules, a 2022 children's animated TV show
 Rosie's Theater Kids, an American non-profit arts education organization
 Rosie (disambiguation)
 Roses (disambiguation)